Rodolpho Martinez is an American politician who served as a member of the New Mexico House of Representatives for District 39 from 2017 to 2021. He previously held the same seat from 2007 until 2015.

Early life and education 
Martinez was born in New Mexico. He earned a Bachelor of Science degree in business from Western New Mexico University.

Career 
He served in the United States Air Force during the Vietnam War. Martinez has worked as a facility services manager. In 2006, Martinez was elected to the New Mexico House of Representatives. In 2014, he was defeated for re-election by Republican John L. Zimmerman. Martinez defeated Zimmerman in 2016 and regained his old House seat. In 2020, Martinez was again defeated for re-election by Republican Luis Terrazas. He left office in January 2021.

References

External links
 
Legislative page

Hispanic and Latino American state legislators in New Mexico
Living people
Democratic Party members of the New Mexico House of Representatives
People from Grant County, New Mexico
Year of birth missing (living people)
21st-century American politicians